Cannonier is a surname. Notable people with the surname include:

Colin Cannonier (born 1973), economics professor, cricketer, and footballer from Saint Kitts
Craig Cannonier (born 1963), Bermudian politician
Jared Cannonier (born 1984), American professional mixed martial artist